The Savannah Victorian Historic District is a historic district in Savannah, Georgia. It is mostly residential in character and features Late Victorian, Queen Anne, and other architectural styles.

The district, which is not part of the Savannah Historic District, was first listed in 1974 and officially extended in 1982. The total area is bounded to the north by the Savannah Historic District, to the west by a public housing project, to the south by a neighborhood of early- to mid-20th-century residences, and to the east by a mixed-use area of Seaboard Coast Line railroad tracks, industry, commerce, housing, and vacant lots.

The original area formed in 1974 covers 45 city blocks and is bordered by Gwinnett, Price, Anderson, and Montgomery Streets. The 1982 extension is bounded by Gwinnett, Abercorn, and 31st Streets, and includes the Carnegie Colored Library, a park, and more residential structures.

The district includes the Asbury United Methodist Church, a historic church building built in 1887 that in 2019 was listed on the Georgia Trust for Historic Preservation's list of Places in Peril.

Gallery

See also
Savannah Historic District

References

External links
 

Historic districts in Chatham County, Georgia
Geography of Savannah, Georgia
Historic districts on the National Register of Historic Places in Georgia (U.S. state)
National Register of Historic Places in Savannah, Georgia